Polregio (formerly Przewozy Regionalne) is a train operator in Poland, responsible for local and interregional passenger transportation. Each day it runs approximately 3,000 regional trains. In 2002 it carried 215 million passengers.

The company was founded in 2001 from the splitup of the PKP Passenger Transport Sector of the once-unitary Polskie Koleje Państwowe national rail operator into several companies to meet European Union requirements.

Train categories 

REGIO (R)
local passenger train, 2nd class only, stops (usually) at all stations
REGIOplus
semi-fast local passenger train, 2nd class only, stops at a limited number of stations, same fare as Regio
interREGIO (IR)
low-cost inter-regional fast train, 2nd class only, stops at medium and major stations only; since 1 September 2015 only on routes Łódź – Warszawa and Ełk – Grodno (Belarus), due to company's economics and restructuring.
REGIOekspres (RE)
fast trains on international routes; stop at major stations only; 1st and 2nd class, higher standard than IR; currently only on the routes: Dresden Hbf - Wrocław Główny  and Frankfurt (Oder)-Poznań (both operated by DB Regio on the German part of the route as RegionalExpress)

There is also a special train service called Balice Ekspres, connecting the John Paul II International Airport Kraków-Balice with Kraków Main railway station with its own fare.

For domestic routes IR and RE trains share the same fare for the 2nd class (meaning you can board an RE train with an IR ticket and vice versa). With the exception of the two above-mentioned RegioEkspres trains, there is no reservation in any of the Przewozy Regionalne trains.

Until 1 December 2008 the company also used to run other 300 interregional and international fast trains, but per the government's decision, the interregional and international fast trains were transferred to its then-sister company, PKP Intercity S.A. and rebranded to "Tanie Linie Kolejowe".

Ownership 
Until 22 December 2008 Przewozy Regionalne was a wholly owned subsidiary of the PKP Group, after that date all of its shares have been transferred to the 16 regional governments. Thus, the company is no longer part of the PKP Group and on interregional routes its InterRegio trains compete with PKP Intercity TLK trains.

On 8 December 2009 it finally changed its name from PKP Przewozy Regionalne to Przewozy Regionalne, and in January 2017, the company started using the brandname POLREGIO for its services.

Fleet

Electric multiple units 
(as at 15 June 2020)

Electric locomotives 
(as at 15 June 2020)

Diesel locomotives 
(as at 15 June 2020)

Carriages 
(as at 15 June 2020)

Diesel  multiple units 
(as at 15 June 2020)

See also 
 Transportation in Poland
 List of railway companies
 Polish locomotives designation

References

External links
 
 

Railway companies of Poland
Railway companies established in 2001
2001 establishments in Poland
Companies based in Warsaw
Polish brands
Polish Limited Liability Companies